Jakob Dorigoni (born 10 March 1998) is an Italian cyclo-cross  and road cyclist, who currently rides for UCI Cyclo-cross team Selle Italia–Guerciotti–Elite.

Major results

Cyclo-cross

2014–2015
 1st  National Junior Championships
 1st Junior Milan
 Junior Giro d'Italia Cross
1st Rossano Veneto
3rd Fiuggi
3rd Isola d'Elba
3rd Padova
3rd Roma
 7th UCI Junior World Championships
2015–2016
 1st  National Junior Championships
 Junior Giro d'Italia Cross
1st Roma
1st Fiuggi
 UCI Junior World Cup
2nd Lignières-en-Berry
 6th UCI Junior World Championships
2016–2017
 1st  National Under-23 Championships
2017–2018
 1st  National Under-23 Championships
2018–2019
 1st  National Under-23 Championships
 UCI Under-23 World Cup
2nd Tábor
2nd Namur
3rd Pontchâteau
2019–2020
 1st  National Championships
 1st Vittorio Veneto
 1st Brugherio
 2nd Milan
 UCI Under-23 World Cup
3rd Namur
 3rd Saccolongo
2020–2021
 Toi Toi Cup
1st Jičín
 2nd National Championships
2021–2022
 1st  National Championships
 1st Cremona
 2nd Lutterbach
 2nd Brugherio
 3rd Fae' Di Oderzo
2022–2023
 3rd Vittorio Veneto

Road
2018
 4th GP Capodarco

References

External links
 

1998 births
Living people
Cyclo-cross cyclists
Italian male cyclists